Condea elegans is a species of flowering plants in the family Lamiaceae. It is found in South America (Argentina, Brazil, Paraguay). The type specimen is described from Paraguarí, Paraguay.

References

External links 
 Condea elegans at Tropicos

Lamiaceae
Plants described in 2012
Flora of Argentina
Flora of Brazil
Flora of Paraguay